Roger Andrés Gutiérrez Cuevas (born April 11, 1995) is a Venezuelan professional boxer who has held the WBA super featherweight title from 2021 to 2022.

Professional career

Early career
Gutiérrez made his professional debut against Alexander Ponce on October 19, 2013. He won the fight by unanimous decision. Gutiérrez amassed a 20-3–1 record during the next five years, before winning his first step-up fight against Leonardo Padilla on December 20, 2018, whom he beat by a fifth-round knockout. Gutiérrez next beat the undefeated Eduardo Hernandez by a first-round knockout on July 13, 2019. Gutiérrez faced Andres Tapia on December 14, 2019, in his final fight before challenging for a world title. He won the bout by unanimous decision.

WBA Regular super featherweight champion

Gutiérrez vs. Alvardo II
On November 5, 2020, the WBA announced that their reigning super featherweight champion René Alvarado would make his first title defense against Gutiérrez. The fight was scheduled for the undercard of the Ryan Garcia and Luke Campbell interim lightweight WBC title bout, which took place on 2 January 2022, at the American Airlines Center in Dallas, Texas. The pair previously fought on July 14, 2017, with Alvardo winning by a seventh-round knockout. Despite Alvardo entering the bout as a -300 favorite to retain, Gutiérrez won the fight by an upset unanimous decision, with all three judges awarding him a 113–112 scorecard. Although Alvardo was able to outbox for the majority of the rounds, Gutiérrez manage to knock the champion on three occasions, which allowed to narrowly edge him out. He first knocked Alvardo down with a right uppercut and a right straight in the third round, while the third knockdown occurred in the twelfth round, when he knocked Alvardo down with a short left hook.

Gutiérrez vs. Alvardo III
Gutiérrez was booked to face René Alvarado in his first title defense. Their rubber match was scheduled for the undercard of the Vergil Ortiz Jr. and Egidijus Kavaliauskas WBO International welterweight title bout, which took place on August 14, 2021, at the Ford Center at The Star in Frisco, Texas and was broadcast by DAZN. Despite his victory against Alvardo seven months prior, Gutiérrez once again entered the fight as an underdog, with most odds-makers having Gutiérrez at +115. He won the fight by unanimous decision. Two judges scored the fight 116–112 in his favor, while the third judge scored it 115–113 for him.

Gutiérrez vs. Garcia
On August 15, 2021, the WBA ordered Gutiérrez to make his second title defense against the interim WBA champion Chris Colbert, giving the pair until September 15 to come to terms. On October 25, 2021, it was revealed that Gutiérrez and Colbert had come to terms to face each other on February 19, 2022, on a Showtime broadcast card. The fight was officially announced on January 24, 2022, as the main event of February 26 PBC card, which will take place at The Cosmopolitan in Las Vegas, Nevada. Gutiérrez withdrew from the bout on February 10, after both he and several members of his team tested positive for COVID-19.

Gutiérrez was instead scheduled to face the mandatory WBA title challenger Héctor García in his second title defense, who had earned the mandatory position with a unanimous decision victory over Colbert. The bout was expected to place at the Poliedro de Caracas in Caracas, Venezuela on July 10, 2022, and was to be broadcast on the WBA's YouTube channel. The fight was later postponed, as the promoters were unable to organize a bout in Venezuela. Accordingly, ordered both sides to renegotiate terms to avoid the fight heading to a purse bid hearing. The bout was rescheduled for August 20, and took place on the Adrien Broner and Omar Figueroa Jr. undercard. Gutiérrez remained inactive throughout the first eight rounds of the bout, which let his opponent build an early lead, and although Gutiérrez picked up the pace from the ninth round onward, he nonetheless lost the fight by unanimous decision, with two scorecards of 117–111 and one scorecard of 118–110.

Professional boxing record

See also
List of world super-featherweight boxing champions

References

External links

1995 births
Living people
Venezuelan male boxers
Sportspeople from Maracaibo
Super-featherweight boxers
Lightweight boxers
World super-featherweight boxing champions
World Boxing Association champions